Madeleine R. Stoner (September 13, 1937 - July 13, 2008) was an American sociologist. She was the Richard M. and Ann L. Thor Professor in Urban Social Development at the University of Southern California, and the author of two books about homelessness. In Inventing a Non-Homeless Future: A Public Policy Agenda for Preventing Homelessness, Stoner dismisses welfare programs as outdated and suggests affordable housing could alleviate homelessness. In The Civil Rights of Homeless People: Law, Social Policy, and Social Work Practice, Stoner argues that the homeless struggle to have access to welfare because the system is based on property rights.

Selected works

References

1937 births
2008 deaths
People from Westwood, Los Angeles
University of Southern California faculty
American sociologists
American women sociologists
21st-century American women